The Danville Correctional Center is an adult male prison of the Illinois Department of Corrections in Danville, Illinois. The facility is located about 5 miles east of central Danville and is located near the Illinois-Indiana border. The prison was opened in October 1985 and has an operational capacity of 1,854 prisoners.

See also
Education Justice Project

References

Prisons in Illinois
1985 establishments in Illinois